Franz Marek (1913–1979) was an Austrian communist politician who edited Weg und Ziel, a monthly journal of the Communist Party of Austria. British historian Eric Hobsbawm described Franz Marek as the hero of the 20th century.

Early life
He was born Ephraim Feuerlicht in Przemyśl, Kingdom of Galicia and Lodomeria, on 18 April 1913 into a  Jewish family. They moved to Vienna, and he was raised there in the St. Leopold district. He was one of the founders of a youth organization targeting Zionist junior high school students. Next he became a member of the Hashomer Hatzair, a socialist and Zionist youth movement.

Career and views
In 1934 Marek joined the Communist Party. He exiled to France in 1938 when Austria became part of the Nazi Germany. He was one of the leaders of the French resistance movement and coedited a publication entitled Nouvelles d’Autriche–Österreichische Nachrichten. When France was occupied by the Nazis Marek was arrested and sentenced to death and was freed only after the liberation of Paris in 1944. He could return to Austria in 1946. He assumed several posts in the Communist Party and was appointed editor-in-chief of Weg und Ziel, party's theoretical journal, in 1946. He also edited Wiener Tagebuch. In 1948 Marek was made a member of the political bureau of the Communist Party.

Marek first adhered to the Stalinist approach. In 1960s he became a critic of it and proposed to develop a European version of communism termed as Eurocommunism. Due to these views and his stance against the invasion of Czechoslovakia by the Soviet Union he was removed from the Communist Party in 1970.

Personal life and death
Marek was married to Tilly Spiegel who was also a resistance member. They divorced in 1974. Marek died of a heart attack on 28 June 1979.

Legacy
In 2017 Marek's memoirs were edited by Maximilian Graf und Sarah Knoll and published under the title Franz Marek. Beruf und Berufung Kommunist by the Mandelbaum Verlag.

References

20th-century Austrian journalists
20th-century Austrian politicians
1913 births
1979 deaths
Austrian expatriates in France
Austrian Jews
Communist Party of Austria politicians
Jewish socialists
Jewish journalists
Jews in the French resistance
Jews from Galicia (Eastern Europe)
People from Przemyśl
Politicians from Vienna